Natassia Gorey-Furber is an Australian actress. She is a Central Arrente woman from Alice Springs. She was nominated for the 2018 AACTA Award for Best Actress in a Supporting Role for her role in Sweet Country.

References

Living people
Actresses from the Northern Territory
Indigenous Australian actresses
People from Alice Springs
Year of birth missing (living people)